Vahe Baghdasaryan (born 20 March 1993, Yerevan, Armenia) is an Armenian chess player. He achieved the International Master (IM) title in 2012 and Grandmaster title in 2017. He won the 10th Nana Aleksandria Cup in July 2015.

Notable Tournaments

References 

1993 births
Living people
Armenian chess players
Chess grandmasters